The 2018 WAFL season (officially the 2018 McDonald’s WAFL Premiership Season) is the 134th season of the various incarnations of the West Australian Football League (WAFL). The season commenced on 30 March 2018 and concluded with the 2018 WAFL Grand Final on 22 September 2018.

Ladder

Clubs

Finals series

Qualifying and Elimination Finals

Semi-finals

Preliminary final

Grand Final

References 

West Australian Football League seasons
WAFL